Ciné Palace was a French television station of AB Groupe, which broadcast from 1996 to September 2002.

History
In 1996, AB Groupe launched a cinema bouquet consisting of 5 channels: Action, Polar, Rire, Romance and Ciné Palace.

In September 2002, AB Groupe set up a new cinema bouquet, which was named Cinébox. It consisted of 4 channels: Ciné Comic, Ciné Polar, Ciné FX and Ciné Box which replaced Ciné Palace.

References

External links

Mediawan Thematics
Defunct television channels in France
Television channels and stations established in 1996
Television channels and stations disestablished in 2002
1996 establishments in France
2002 disestablishments in France